The name Bill has been used for five tropical cyclones in the Atlantic Ocean.
 Hurricane Bill (1997), threatened Bermuda, but passed the island without incident
 Tropical Storm Bill (2003), made landfall west of New Orleans killing four and causing $50 million in damages
 Hurricane Bill (2009), a large Category 4 hurricane that passed Bermuda and grazed Nova Scotia before striking Newfoundland as a tropical storm
 Tropical Storm Bill (2015), made landfall in southeastern Texas causing minimal damage
 Tropical Storm Bill (2021), short lived tropical storm which remained in the open ocean

The name Bill has also been used for three tropical cyclones in the Western Pacific Ocean.
 Typhoon Bill (1981) (T8119, 19W), formed east-southeast of Marcus Island; did not make landfall
 Typhoon Bill (1984) (T8425, 28W, Welpring), looped southeastward while just east of Luzon, and looped again to the southwest
 Tropical Storm Bill (1988) (T8809, 08W), struck China

Atlantic hurricane set index articles
Pacific typhoon set index articles